New York Theatre may stand for:

New York Theatre Workshop, off-Broadway theatre in the Bowery, Lower East Side of Manhattan
Bowery Theatre, Lower East Side of Manhattan, New York City
Olympia Theatre (New York City), built by Oscar Hammerstein I
New Theatre Comique, former theater in New York City

See also
 Culture of New York City#Theatre
New York Theatre Ballet